Aethes elpidia is a species of moth of the family Tortricidae. It was described by Razowski in 1983. It is endemic to Tunisia.

References

elpidia
Moths described in 1983
Taxa named by Józef Razowski
Moths of Africa